Mehmet Ali Islioğlu (born 1926) was a Turkish wrestler. He competed in the men's freestyle welterweight at the 1952 Summer Olympics.

References

External links
 

1926 births
Possibly living people
Turkish male sport wrestlers
Olympic wrestlers of Turkey
Wrestlers at the 1952 Summer Olympics
Place of birth missing